The following is a list of current drum corps competing as members of Drum Corps International (DCI).

Member corps

World Class members 

† = One of the thirteen charter members of Drum Corps International.

Open Class members

International members

Inactive corps 

Below is an incomplete list of corps who are inactive, suspended from competition, or have had their DCI membership revoked, and that plan or are attempting to return to the field.

See also 
 List of Drum Corps Associates member corps
 List of drum corps

References 

DCI drum corps